This is a truncated, illustrated  list of works by Alphonse Maria Mucha''', and shows few examples of the many iconic images for which he is famous.

Notes and references

External links

Mucha
Mucha, Alphonse
Czech art